Charles Gilbert (born May 18, 1987) is an American football wide receiver who is currently a free agent. He played college football at Concordia University in Saint Paul, Minnesota.

References

External links
 Concordia Golden Bears bio
 Arena Football Stats

1987 births
American football wide receivers
Living people
Webber International Warriors football players
Concordia Golden Bears football players
Jacksonville Sharks players
Knoxville NightHawks players
Columbus Lions players
New Orleans VooDoo players
Players of American football from Jacksonville, Florida